Sohel Rana may refer to:

 Sohel Rana (actor), Bangladeshi film actor in Taka and others
 Sohel Rana (businessman), Bangladeshi owner of Rana Plaza building which collapsed April 2013
 Sohel Rana (cricketer) (born 1996), Bangladeshi cricketer
 Sohel Rana (footballer, born 1995), Bangladeshi footballer who plays for Abahani Limited Dhaka